Juan Pérez may refer to:

Arts and entertainment 
Juan Pérez de Gijón (before 1440—after 1500), Spanish Renaissance composer
Juan Pérez de Montalbán (1602–1638), Spanish dramatist, poet and novelist
Juan Pérez Roldán (1604–1672), Spanish composer 
Juan Antonio Pérez Bonalde (1846–1892), Venezuelan poet
Juan Pérez Floristán (born 1993), Spanish pianist
Juan Pérez (Saving Private Perez), titular character in 2011 Mexican comedy film Saving Private Perez

Nobility and explorers
Juan Pérez de Guzmán (1240–1285), Spanish nobleman
Juan Alonso Pérez de Guzmán, 6th Duke of Medina Sidonia (1502–1558), Spanish duke
Juan Pérez de Zurita (1516–), Spanish conquistador
Juan José Pérez Hernández (–1775), Spanish explorer

Politics and law
Juan Pérez-Caballero y Ferrer (1861–1951), Spanish politician
Juan Pablo Pérez Alfonzo (1903–1979), Venezuelan politician
Juan Pérez-Giménez (1941–2020), American jurist in Puerto Rico
Juan Pérez Alsina (born 1954), Argentine politician
Juan Perez (American politician) (born 1956), mayor of Sheboygan, Wisconsin
Juan Carlos Pérez Góngora (born 1960), Mexican politician and lawyer
Juan Pérez Medina (born 1960), Mexican politician and educator

Religion
Juan Pérez (friar) (before 1460—before 1513), Spanish Franciscan and companion of Christopher Columbus
Juan Pérez de Espinosa (1558–1622), Spanish priest
Juan Pérez Bocanegra (before 1570—1645), Spanish priest
Juan Pérez de la Serna (1573–1631), seventh Archbishop of Mexico

Sports

Association football (soccer)
Juan Pérez (footballer, born 1980), Panamanian defensive midfielder
Juan Manuel Pérez Bernal (born 1985), Mexican footballer known as "Kichi"
Juan David Pérez (born 1991), Colombian footballer
Juan Manuel Pérez (born 1993), Argentine footballer
Juan Pérez (footballer, born 1996), Spanish goalkeeper

Other sports
Juan Pérez (cyclist) (born 1932), Chilean Olympic cyclist
Juan Pérez (handballer) (born 1974), Spanish Olympic handball medalist in 1996 and 2000
Juan Andrés Pérez (born 1975), Uruguayan rugby union hooker
Juan Pérez (pitcher) (born 1978), Dominican in Major League Baseball
Juan Carlos Pérez (born 1981), Bolivian trap shooter in 2012 Olympics 
Juan Pérez (outfielder) (born 1986), Dominican in Major League Baseball
Juan Pérez (sailor) (born 1991), Mexican sailor

Others 
Juan Pérez de la Riva (1913–1976), Cuban historian
Juan Antonio Pérez López (1934–1996), Spanish business theorist
Juan Ignacio Pérez Iglesias (born 1960), Spanish university professor of physiology

Other uses
Juan Perez Sound, ocean inlet in British Columbia, Canada named after the explorer
Juan Pablo Pérez Alfonzo Airport, Venezuelan airport named after the politician 
In Spanish language, the name is also often used to refer to a hypothetical "everyman" in other contexts, like John Doe or John Q. Public